David Lee Meggett (born April 30, 1966) is a former American football running back who played in the National Football League (NFL) for 10 seasons. He played college football at Towson and was selected by the New York Giants in the fifth round of the 1989 NFL Draft. Primarily utilized on special teams as a return specialist, he received one Pro Bowl and two first-team All-Pro selections during his six seasons with the Giants, in addition to winning a Super Bowl title in Super Bowl XXV. Meggett spent his next three seasons as a member of the New England Patriots, where he was named to a second Pro Bowl. In his final season, he played for the New York Jets. Meggett retired with a then-record 3,708 punt return yards, which are the second-most in NFL history.

Involved in several legal problems during and after his playing career, Meggett was convicted in 2010 on burglary and criminal sexual conduct charges. He is currently serving a 30-year prison sentence at Lieber Correctional Institution in South Carolina.

College career

Meggett played college football at division II Towson college from 1986-1988.  In his senior season, Meggett led the team in rushing yards (844) and touchdowns (12), while also setting a school record for average yards per kickoff return (32.2) and kickoff return touchdowns (2), earning him the Walter Payton Award.  His career average of 25.5 yards per kickoff return (29 returns for 745 yards) was also a school record.

Professional career
Meggett was used frequently as both a rusher and a receiver in his NFL career, but was primarily used to return kickoffs and punts on special teams. He led the league in punt return yards (582) in his rookie season, while gaining 577 kickoff return yards, 531 receiving yards, and 117 rushing yards, earning him a trip to the Pro Bowl. Meggett led the NFL in punt return yards again in his second season (467), helping the Giants record a 13–3 regular season record and a 20–19 victory over the Buffalo Bills in Super Bowl XXV. During the 1990 postseason Meggett saw his duties increase when starting running back Rodney Hampton went down with an injury. Splitting time with veteran back Ottis Anderson, he had a solid performance in the Super Bowl, recording 129 all-purpose yards (48 rushing, 18 receiving, 37 punt return, 26 kickoff return).

After four more seasons with New York, Meggett signed with the Patriots in 1995, reuniting with his coach Bill Parcells, who had been his coach with the Giants. In 1996, he had the best season of his career, recording 1,966 all-purpose yards, earning his second trip to the Pro Bowl, and helped New England gain a berth in Super Bowl XXXI. Although his team lost the game 35–21 to the Green Bay Packers, his performance was solid, recording 155 total yards (117 kick return, 30 punt return, eight receiving). Meggett spent one more year with the Patriots before being released due to legal issues. Meggett then join New York Jets in 1998 (once again joining Parcells in a move to new team), but played in just two games during the season.  Once again a free agent, Meggett was not resigned by the Jets.  Receiving no offers from any other team, Meggett retired at the age of 32, just two years after making the Pro Bowl.

In his ten NFL seasons, Meggett amassed 1,648 rushing yards, 336 receptions for 3,083 yards, 3,708 punt return yards, and 5,566 yards returning kickoffs. In total, Meggett gained 14,005 all-purpose yards and scored 29 touchdowns (eight rushing, 11 receiving, seven punt returns, one kickoff return).. He also completed four of eight passes for 114 yards and four touchdowns..

At the time of his retirement, his 3,709 punt return yards were the most in NFL history; he has since been passed by Brian Mitchell.

Subsequent to his NFL career, Meggett was an assistant coach at American International College for over two years, and then moved to North Carolina.

Personal life and prison sentence
Meggett has nine children from eight different women, including Davin Meggett, who grew up in Clinton, Maryland. He went to Surrattsville High School and played football at the University of Maryland.

Meggett was one of the favorite players of coach Bill Parcells, playing for him on the Giants, Patriots, and Jets. When Parcells coached the Dallas Cowboys, Meggett consulted with the team's punt returners during training camp.

In 1990, Meggett was arrested for soliciting a prostitute, but was acquitted. He was charged with assaulting his then-girlfriend in 1995, but was acquitted after the judge found that the girlfriend was the aggressor and that Meggett had used "reasonable force" to keep her out of his house.

In 1998, Meggett was arrested in Toronto after authorities said he allegedly assaulted an escort worker after a three-way sexual encounter. Following this incident, the Patriots promptly released him per their zero-tolerance policy for violence against women enacted after the furor of the selection of Christian Peter two years earlier. According to a 2014 report in SB Nation, the fallout from this incident led other teams to look askance at Meggett's history with women, and was a reason why his number was never called by another NFL team after the Jets opted against re-signing him. A trial on the assault charge ended with a hung jury in April 2000.

In later years, Meggett faced multiple legal and financial difficulties related to his failure to pay child support. He'd earned over $10 million during his NFL career, but lost it all to back child support payments. He was even forced to sell his Super Bowl ring on eBay.

Meggett was the parks and recreation director in Robersonville, North Carolina. Most of his salary was diverted to pay child support. He resigned in 2006, after he was accused of sexually assaulting his former girlfriend. In 2007, he was convicted of misdemeanor sexual battery in the case, receiving two years' probation. Authorities said he was allowed to move back to South Carolina to serve his probation. Soon afterward, in 2008, he was accused of sexually assaulting a 17-year-old girl, but prosecutors opted not to pursue the case due to questions about her credibility.

In January 2009, Meggett was arrested for raping and robbing a part-time student at the College of Charleston. On November 10, 2010, Meggett was convicted of burglary and criminal sexual conduct, and sentenced to 30 years in prison.

Meggett, South Carolina Department of Corrections ID #00343610, is serving his sentence at Lieber Correctional Institution in Ridgeville, South Carolina. His earliest possible release date is July 6, 2034. While incarcerated, Meggett has accrued several disciplinary infractions for possessing or attempted possession of a cell phone, leading to detention and loss of privileges.

See also
 History of the New York Giants (1979–93)

References

1966 births
Living people
African-American players of American football
American people convicted of burglary
American Conference Pro Bowl players
American football running backs
American football return specialists
American prisoners and detainees
American people convicted of sexual assault
Morgan State Bears football players
National Conference Pro Bowl players
New York Giants players
New England Patriots players
New York Jets players
Sportspeople from Charleston, South Carolina
People convicted of battery
Players of American football from South Carolina
Prisoners and detainees of South Carolina
Towson Tigers football players
Walter Payton Award winners
American sportspeople convicted of crimes
Ed Block Courage Award recipients